Krowicki (feminine: Krowicka; plural: Krowiccy) is a Polish surname. Notable people with the surname include:

 Leszek Krowicki (born 1957), Polish handball coach
 Marcin Krowicki (1500–1573), Polish theologian

See also
 

Polish-language surnames